The Monastery of Saint Mamas was a monastery in the Byzantine capital, Constantinople, supposedly first founded in the 6th century, and surviving until the end of the 14th century.

History
The monastery was located in the southwestern part of the city, near the Xylokerkos Gate in the Theodosian Walls. According to later tradition, it was founded in the 6th century, either by a chamberlain of Emperor Justinian I called Pharasmanes, or slightly later by Gordia, sister of Emperor Maurice. Certainly Maurice's family was associated with the monastery in some form, possibly using it as their family mausoleum: both Maurice and his wife, Empress Constantina, were buried there.

Having fallen into decline, the monastery was restored in the late 10th century by Symeon the New Theologian, who served as its abbot for 25 years. By the 12th century, the monastery had once again declined, reportedly because the charistikiarioi, laymen who managed the monastery's estates, abused their position. It was rescued by the mystikos George Kappadokes, who restored the monastery complex and secured its position via a chrysobull from Emperor Manuel I Komnenos. In the course of this process, in 1158 the abbot Athanasios Philanthropenos composed a new charter (typikon) for the monastery, based on the model of Theotokos Euergetis Monastery.

The monastery is known to have survived at least until 1399.

References

Sources
 

Churches and monasteries of Constantinople